is a largely archaic Japanese name for China. The word was originally used neutrally in both the Chinese and Japanese languages, but came to be perceived as derogatory by the Chinese during the course of the Sino-Japanese Wars.

Origins and early usage 

Thus, the term Shina was initially created as a transliteration of Cina, and this term was in turn brought to Japan with the spread of Chinese Buddhism. Some scholars believe that the Sanskrit Cina, like Middle Persian Čīn and Latin Sina, is derived from the Qin state or dynasty which ruled China in 221–206 BC, and so Shina is a return of Qin to Chinese in a different form.

The Sanskrit term for China eventually spread into China, where its usage was closely related to Buddhism. A Tang Dynasty (618–907) poem titled Ti Fan Shu (literally "topic of a Sanskrit book") by Emperor Xuanzong of Tang uses the term in Chinese  to refer to China, which is an early use of the word in China:

Early modern usage

The Latin term for China was Sinae, plural of Sina. Then he began to use this word for China regardless of dynasty. Since the Meiji Era, Shina had been widely used as the translation of the Western term "China". For instance, "Sinology" was translated as "".

At first, it was widely accepted that the term "Shina" or "Zhina" had no political connotations in China. Before the Chinese Republican era, the term "Shina" was one of the names proposed as a "generalized, basically neutral Western-influenced equivalent for 'China.  Chinese revolutionaries, such as Sun Yat-sen, Song Jiaoren, and Liang Qichao, used the term extensively, and it was also used in literature as well as by ordinary Chinese. The term "transcended politics, as it were, by avoiding reference to a particular dynasty (the Qing) or having to call China the country of the Qing". With the overthrow of the Qing in 1911, however, most Chinese dropped Shina as foreign and demanded that Japan replace it with the Japanese reading of the Chinese characters used as the name of the new Republic of China , with the short form .

Nevertheless, the term continued to be more-or-less neutral. A Buddhist school called  was established as late as in 1922 in Nanjing. In the meantime, "Shina" was used as commonly in Japanese as "China" in English.

The Republic of China unofficially pressed Japan to adopt the latter but was rejected.

Japan rejected the terms "" and its short form  for four reasons: (1) the term referring to China as "the Middle Kingdom" (a literal translation of "" / "") or "the center of the world" was deemed arrogant; (2) Western countries used "China"; (3) Shina was the common name in Japan for centuries; (4) Japan already has a Chūgoku region, in the west of its main island Honshu. The name "Chūka Minkoku" was officially adopted by Japan in 1930, but "Shina" was still commonly used by the Japanese throughout the 1930s and 1940s.

Post-war derogatory connotations 
The Second Sino-Japanese War fixed the impression of the term "Shina" as offensive among Chinese people. In 1946, the Republic of China demanded that Japan cease using "Shina".

In China, the term Shina has become linked with the Japanese invasion and Japanese war crimes, and has been considered a derogatory and deeply offensive ethnic slur ever since. Although many assume that the term was created (or chosen) by the Japanese for exclusive use as a racist term, since the character  means "branch" which could be interpreted to suggest that the Chinese are subservient to the Japanese, the characters were originally chosen simply for their sound values, not their meanings.

In modern Japan, the term  refers to the Republic of China, while  refers to the People's Republic of China; the terms use the same Chinese characters (with Japanese shinjitai simplifications) used officially in both the People's Republic of China and the Republic of China.

Writing Shina in Japanese is considered socially unacceptable and subject to kotobagari, especially the kanji form (if Shina is used, it is now generally written in katakana). Many Japanese are not fully aware of Chinese feelings towards the term, and generally find Shina merely old-fashioned and associated with the early and mid-20th century, rather than derogatory and racist. This difference in conception can lead to misunderstandings. The term is a slur when used toward Ryukyuans by mainland Japanese people.

On the other hand, the term Shina/Zhina has survived in a few non-political compound words in both Chinese and Japanese. Shinachiku ( or simply ), a ramen topping made from dried bamboo, also derives from the term "Shina", but in recent years the word  has replaced this as a more politically correct name.

Sinologist, historian professor Joshua A. Fogel mentioned that "Surveying the present scene indicates much less sensitivity on the part of Chinese to the term Shina and growing ignorance of it in Japan". He also criticized Ishihara Shintarō, a right-wing nationalist politician who went out of his way to use the expression "" and called him a "troublemaker".

"Many terms have been offered as names for countries and ethnic groups that have simply not withstood the pressures of time and circumstance and have, accordingly, changed. Before the mid-1960s, virtually every well-meaning American, black or white and regardless of political affinity, referred to blacks as 'Negroes' with no intention of offense or slight. It was simply the respectful name in use; and it was superior to the openly reviled and offensive term "colored," still in legal use by people in the South (to say nothing of the highly offensive term in colloquial use by this group)... By the late 1960s, few if any liberals were still using 'Negro' but had shifted to 'black,' because that was declared the ethnonym of choice by the group so named."

Current usage

In Japan 
Japanese Canadian historian Bob Tadashi Wakabayashi mentioned that there are two classes of postwar Japanese have continued to use derogatory terms like Shina: poorly educated and/or elderly persons who grew up with the term go on using these from force of habit.

Some right-wing Japanese appeal to etymology in trying to ascribe respectability to the continued use of Shina, since the term Shina has non-pejorative etymological origins. Wakabayashi said: "The term Jap also has non-pejorative etymological origins, since it derives from Zippangu in Marco Polo's Travels... If the Chinese today say they are hurt by the terms Shina or Shinajin, then common courtesy enjoins the Japanese to stop using these terms, whatever the etymology or historical usage might be."

In Hong Kong 
During the Japanese occupation of Hong Kong, the Japanese government classified Hong Kong residents as Shinajin, as the term was used to refer to all who were ethnically Chinese. Hongkongers that were considered useful to the Japanese government, as well as prominent local figures such as bankers and lawyers, were recorded in a census document called the "Hong Kong Shinajin Magnate Survey". In 2016, a Hong Kong reporter was called  by Japanese nationalist politician Shintaro Ishihara.

In Hong Kong, "Cheena", the Cantonese pronunciation of "Shina", is used in a derogative sense under the backdrop of ongoing tensions between Hong Kong and mainland China, even in official capacity, for example by Hong Kong localist politicians Yau Wai-ching and Sixtus Leung during their controversial oath swearing as elected members of the Hong Kong legislature. Ray Wong, founder of the localist group Hong Kong Indigenous, said that he uses "Cheena" to refer to mainland China because the "[Chinese] Communist Party is my personal enemy".

On 15 September 2012, a Hong Kong online community organized a protest against mainlanders and parallel traders. During the protest, some demonstrators chanted "Cheena people get out [of Hong Kong]!" On 24 September 2013, the Hong Kong political group Hongkongers Priority breached the front entrance of the Chinese People's Liberation Army Forces Hong Kong Building, the first such incident since the handover of Hong Kong. Billy Chiu, the leader of Hongkongers Priority, later announced on social media that Hongkongers Priority had successfully broken into the "Cheena Army Garrison". In October 2015, an HKGolden netizen remade the South Korean song "Gangnam Style", with lyrics calling mainland Chinese "locusts" and "Cheena people", titled "Disgusting Cheena Style".

Inside Hong Kong university campuses, mainland Chinese students are often referred to as "Cheena dogs" and "yellow thugs" by local students. On 18 September 2019, the 88th anniversary of the Japanese invasion of northeastern China, a celebration poster was put up on the Democracy Wall of the University of Hong Kong, glorifying the Japanese invasion while advocating for democracy in Hong Kong. Hong Kong journalist Audrey Li noted the xenophobic undertone of the widespread right-wing nativism movement, in which the immigrant population and tourists are used as scapegoats for social inequality and institutional failure. 
 
In Hong Kong, some people consider 'hate speech' and even discrimination toward mainland Chinese morally justified by a superiority complex influenced by Hong Kong's economic and cultural prominence during the Cold War, and nostalgia toward British rule. Some protesters choose to express their frustrations on ordinary mainlanders instead of the Chinese government. With rising tribalism and nationalism in Hong Kong and China, xenophobia between Hong
Kongers and mainlanders is reinforced and reciprocated. Some critics of Hong Kong's pro-democracy movement argue that the prevalence of ethnic hatred and xenophobia amongst its supporters is mostly ignored by the media, which often frames the situation as simply a fight between democracy and authoritarianism.

See also 
 Names of China
 Chinaman
 Chink
 Chinky
 Locust
 Wokou
 Xiao Riben
 Ethnic issues in Japan

References

Further reading 
 Joshua A. Fogel, "The Sino-Japanese Controversy over Shina as a Toponym for China," in The Cultural Dimension of Sino-Japanese Relations: Essays on the Nineteenth and Twentieth Centuries, ed. Joshua A. Fogel (Armonk, NY: M.E. Sharpe, 1995), 66–76.
 Lydia He Liu. The Clash of Empires: The Invention of China in Modern World Making. (Cambridge, MA: Harvard University Press,  2004). ), esp. pp. 76–79.

Political terminology
Racism in Japan
Names of China
Anti-Chinese sentiment
Ethnic and religious slurs